An Indian’s Loyalty is a 1913 American short silent Western film directed by Christy Cabanne and featuring Lillian Gish.

Cast
 Frank Opperman as The Ranchero
 Lillian Gish as The Ranchero's Daughter
 Edward Dillon as The Young Foreman
 Eagle Eye as The Indian
 Fred Burns as The Ranch Hand
 Lionel Barrymore as The Cattle Buyer
 William A. Carroll as The Accomplice
 Dark Cloud (actor) as An Indian

References

External links
 

1913 films
1913 Western (genre) films
1913 short films
American silent short films
American black-and-white films
Films directed by Christy Cabanne
Films about Native Americans
Silent American Western (genre) films
1910s American films